Bryggen inscription 145 (N B145 in Rundata) is a runic inscription on a wooden stick found among the medieval rune-staves of Bergen. It has four sides, and dates to around the year 1200. It is notable not only for containing a rare Skaldic love poem in the form of a complete dróttkvætt stanza, but also a quote from the classical Latin poet Virgil, illustrating the coexistence of native Norse and Classical education in medieval Norway.

Inscription
The lines §A, §B and §D have all been carved by the same hand, while §C appears to have been executed by another, less experienced rune-carver.

Transliteration from Scandinavian Runic-text Database (Rundata), with minor changes.

Runic transliteration
 §A fe=ll · til · friþra=r · þ(e)=llu · fa=rl(e)=gh=ra=r · m(e)=r · a=rla · fiska=ll · festiba=la · fo=rn · byr hama=r
 §B no=r=na · þæim (u)ihdi · he=uir þunda=r · þo=rnluþrs · (e)o=lun·buþa=r · g=lo=uma=r · gyghia=rto=uma
 §C ka=lt=rs falkha · haldet ⁓ omnia : uinsciþ · amo=r · æþ nos c=(c)itam(m)-- · amori ·
 §D ga=ld=rs fasl(e)=gha · haldet ⁓ omnia · uinciþ · amo=r · æþ · nos · c(e)damus · amori ·

Interpretation

Old West Norse and Latin normalization
Note that lundi is emendated from the nonsensical and metrically faulty uihdi of the inscription.
 Fell til fríðrar þellu
 fárligrar mér árla
 fiskáls festibála
 forn byrr hamarnorna.
 Þeim lundi hefir Þundar
 þornlúðrs jǫlunbúðar
 glauma gýgjartauma
 galdrs fastliga haldit.
 Omnia vincit Amor, et nos cedam[us] Amori.

English translation
The first helmingr (half-verse) is relatively straight forward. It translates (with kennings in brackets):
 The ancient breeze of the cliff-goddesses [GIANTESSES > DESIRE] fell to me early with respect to the beautiful, dangerous young pine-tree of the fastened fire of the fish expanse [SEA > GOLD > (beautiful, dangerous, young) WOMAN].
Simplified, this means:
 Desire for the beautiful, dangerous young woman overcame me a long time ago.

Finally, the Latin quote at the end is from Eclogue X by Virgil, and means "Love conquers all; let us, too, yield to love!".

References

Litterature
 Marold, Edith. 1998d. Runeninschriften als Quelle zur Geschichte der Skaldendichtung. In Düwel et al. 1998, 667-93.
 

Bryggen inscriptions
Runic inscriptions
Skaldic poems